A switch hitter is a baseball player who bats both right-handed and left-handed.

Switch hitter may also refer to:

 Switch-hitter, a boxer who can fight in both orthodox (right-handed) and southpaw (left-handed) stances
 Switch Hitter, an episode of the TV series Arrested Development
 A slang term for a bisexual person

See also
 Switch hit, a cricket shot